DAO is an album by the American jazz saxophonist David S. Ware, recorded in 1995 and released on Homestead. In contrast with most of the quartet's previous albums, they didn't undergo the usual rigorous rehearsals for the recording, getting into the studio the day after the Oblations and Blessings sessions. DAO was the fifth and last recording by the David S. Ware Quartet with drummer Whit Dickey, who would be replaced by Susie Ibarra.

Reception

In his review for AllMusic, Thom Jurek states: "This is a stunner, and a beautiful example of four musicians listening intently to one another in the process of discovery."
The Penguin Guide to Jazz wrote that "DAO is Ware's attempt to create his own A Love Supreme, a connected sequence of highly spiritual themes for what was rapidly becoming a 'classic quartet'."

Track listing
All compositions by David S. Ware
 "Interdao" – 6:22
 "Motif Dao" – 9:18 
 "Rhythm Dao" – 7:00 
 "Tao Above Sky" – 7:36 
 "Dao Forms" – 18:16
 "Dao Feel" – 8:28
 "Dao" – 15:20

Personnel
David S. Ware – tenor sax
Matthew Shipp – piano
William Parker – bass
Whit Dickey – drums

References

1996 albums
David S. Ware albums
Homestead Records albums